Abhijit Majumdar is an Indian film music director and composer in Odia films.

Career 
Abhijit Majumdar started his career from Sambalpuri Industry, later he started working on Ollywood. He is the most reputed music composer of Odia Film Industry. He has composed more than 700 songs for Odia Movies, Album & Sambalpuri industry.

Filmography

References

External links
 

Indian film score composers
Living people
Year of birth missing (living people)